Mawlana Abdur Rahim (2 March 1918 – 1 October 1987) was a Bangladeshi Islamic scholar and well known politician in South Asia and the first promoter of the Jamaat-e-Islami Bangladesh.

He has translated several books written by prominent Islamic scholars such as Abul A'la Maududi and Yusuf al-Qaradawi into Bengali and has himself written widely on the fundamentals of Islam in both Urdu and Bengali.

Early life
Abdur Rahim was born in the village of Shialkathi, Pirojpur District in Bangladesh. His father was Haji Khabiruddin and mother Aklimunnessa. He was fourth among the twelve children in the family. Prominent among his brothers was his eldest brother A.T.M Abdul Wahid, graduate from Alia Madrasa of Calcutta and a well known literary figure. Two of his brothers, M.A Karim and M.A Sattar, are also both well-known writers.

Education
After completing first four years of education at the village mosque beside his home, he got admitted into the Sharshina Aliya Madrasa in 1934. Here he studied for about five years. In 1938, Abdur Rahim graduated with merit from Sharsina aliya Madrassah, after which he got admitted into Aliya Madrasa of Calcutta (presently Aliah University) from where he passed his Fazil and Kamil exams in 1940 and 1942, respectively.

Role in Jamaat-e-Islami
Abdur Rahim used to receive the magazine Tarjamanul Qur'an edited by Abul A'la Maududi when he was a student at the Aliya Madrasa. Deeply influenced by this magazine and other writings of Syed Abul A'la Maududi, Abdur Rahim participated in the All-Indian conference of Jamaat-e-Islami held in Allahabad in 1946, from where he got acquainted with many leaders of the Jamaat. He subsequently joined the organisation in 1946-47 session.

Abdur Rahim was among the four people who started to work in Dhaka to establish the roots of Jamaat-e-Islami in Bangladesh. The others were Rafi Ahmed Indori, Khurshid Ahmed Bhat and Qari Jalil Ashrafi Nadwi. In 1955, Abdur Rahim was elected Ameer of East Pakistan Jamaat-e-Islami. In 1970, he became Nayeb-e-Ameer (vice chairman or vice president) of Jamaat-e-Islami Pakistan, while Golam Azam was elected the new Ameer of Jamaat-e-Islami East Pakistan.
He was the first elected leader of Jamaat-e-Islami Bangladesh.
During the Liberation War of 1971, he was stranded in Pakistan after the outbreak of war and was only able to return to the country in 1974. During the period of 1971–1978, Jamaat was banned from doing politics in Bangladesh.

He was instrumental in bringing various Islamic political parties under the banner of the Islamic Democratic League (IDL), which won 20 seats in the parliamentary elections held on 18 February 1979.

Books
Abdur Rahim has written many books in his lifetime. Some of his books include:

 Al-Qurane’r Aloke Unnoto Jiboner Adorsho [The Ideal of An Improved Way of Life in the Light of the Holy Quran, 1980]
 Ajker Chintadhara (The Trends of Today's Thinking, 1980)
 Pashchatto Shobbhotar Darshonik Bhitti (the Philosophical Basis of the West's civilization, 1984)
 Al-Quraner Nobuuet O Risalat [1984]
 Al-Quraner Aloke Shirk O Towheed [1983]
 Al-Quraner Rashtro O Shorkar [1988]
 Islamer Zakat Bidhan (1982–86)- translation of book by Yusuf Al Qaradawi
 Bingsho Shotabdir Jahliyat (1982–1986) - translation of book by Sayyid Qutb
 Tafheemul Quran, 19 volumes- translation of book by Maududi
 Sunnat O Bidaat''

Death
On 29 September 1987, he became ill. Admitted to hospital on 30 September, he died on 1 October 1987 in Dhaka.

References

1918 births
1987 deaths
Jamaat-e-Islami Pakistan politicians
Bangladeshi politicians
People from Pirojpur District
Bangladeshi Sunni Muslim scholars of Islam
20th-century Bengalis
Pakistani scholars
Bengali Muslim scholars of Islam